Thylactus insignis is a species of beetle in the family Cerambycidae. It was described by Charles Joseph Gahan in 1890. It has a wide distribution in Africa.

References

Xylorhizini
Beetles described in 1890